Chlorosoma laticeps is a species of venomous snake of the family Colubridae.

Geographic range
The snake is found in Bolivia and Brazil.

References 

Reptiles described in 1900
Taxa named by Franz Werner
Chlorosoma
Snakes of South America
Reptiles of Bolivia
Reptiles of Brazil